Cube Entertainment Inc. (Korean: 큐브엔터테인먼트) is a South Korean entertainment company currently manages several artists, namely Jo Kwon, BTOB, CLC, Pentagon, Yoo Seon-ho, (G)I-dle, and Lightsum. It also manages several entertainers, including Lee Hwi-jae and Heo Kyung-hwan. It was formerly home to K-pop artists such as 4Minute, Beast, G.NA, Roh Ji-hoon, A Train To Autumn, Lai Kuan-lin and Jang Hyun-seung.

As of 2017, most of the label's music is distributed by Kakao M (formerly LOEN Entertainment) through a partnership agreement.

On November 23, 2018, Cube established joint label 'U-CUBE' with Universal Music Japan as part of a global partnership.

In 2019, Cube Entertainment chose NetEase Music as its strategic partner as a platform to promote in China.

2000s

2005

2008

2009

2010s

2010

2011

2012

2013

2014

2015

2016

2017

2018

2019

2020s

2020

2021

2022

Notes

See also
Cube Entertainment Projects

BtoB discography
List of songs recorded by BtoB
CLC discography
List of songs recorded by CLC
Pentagon discography
List of songs recorded by Pentagon
(G)I-dle discography
List of songs recorded by (G)I-dle
4Minute discography
List of songs recorded by 4Minute
Hyuna discography
Highlight discography

References

External links
  
  

Discography
Discographies of South Korean record labels
Pop music discographies